Interstate 71 (I-71) is a north–south Interstate Highway in the Midwestern and Southeastern regions of the United States. Its southern terminus is at an interchange with I-64 and I-65 (the Kennedy Interchange) in Louisville, Kentucky, and its northern terminus at an interchange with I-90 in Cleveland, Ohio. While most odd numbered Interstates run north–south, I-71 takes more of a northeast-southeast course, with some east–west sections, and is mainly a regional route serving Kentucky and Ohio. It links I-80 and I-90 to I-70, and ultimately (via I-65) links to I-40. Major metropolitan areas served by I-71 include Louisville, Cincinnati, Columbus, and Cleveland.

Approximately three quarters of the route lie east of I-75, leaving I-71 out of place in the Interstate grid.

Route description

|-
|KY
|
|-
|OH
|
|-
|Total
|
|}

Kentucky

In Kentucky, I-71 begins east of Downtown Louisville at the Kennedy Interchange, where it meets I-64 and I-65. This interchange is sometimes called the "Spaghetti Junction". From Louisville, it roughly follows the Ohio River in a diagonal path toward Northern Kentucky.

Near the town of Carrollton, there are signs marking the location of a tragic accident that occurred on May 14, 1988, when a drunk driver was driving north in the southbound lanes and struck a church bus full of children and teenagers, causing the bus's fuel tank to ignite into flames and killing 27 people on board. It is one of the worst bus accidents in state and national history.

After having run  from Louisville, I-71 merges with I-75 near Walton after which it intersects I-275, the Cincinnati beltway. After passing through Covington, the freeway crosses the Ohio River via the lower level of the Brent Spence Bridge (while the southbound direction uses the upper level) and continues into Cincinnati.

Ohio

Just east of downtown, US 50 splits from I-71 and continues east; I-71 bends north and receives I-471, a spur from southeast of the city. I-71 then heads in a general northeast direction through urban Cincinnati and into its surrounding suburbs. After another interchange with the I-275 beltway, the freeway leaves the metropolitan area and heads toward Columbus. It continues northeast until it reaches South Lebanon, where it begins cutting east across the flat plains of southwest Ohio. I-71 heads toward Columbus then intersects with the bypass I-270 before heading north into urban Columbus, where it junctions I-70. After another interchange with the I-270 bypass, the highway exits Columbus and continues north until near Delaware, where it again turns northeast. Beginning its path to Cleveland, I-71 enters the rolling farm country on the edges of the Allegheny Plateau. It continues in this fashion to Lodi/Westfield Center and its junction with I-76, which provides access to Akron and points east. Heading north to Medina, it meets the terminus of I-271. The highway then continues north into urban Cuyahoga County and Cleveland's suburbs, intersecting the Ohio Turnpike/I-80. Passing Cleveland Hopkins International Airport, I-71 meets I-480 and enters Cleveland's west side, continuing on to downtown. It junctions with State Route 176 (SR 176) and terminates at I-90 on the Innerbelt.

History

Kentucky

The first section of I-71 in Louisville opened in December 1966 between its terminus at Spaghetti Junction and Zorn Avenue, its first exit. Its junction with I-264 opened in July 1968, and the complete Kentucky portion of the Interstate was opened to the public in July 1969. At that point, it replaced US 42 as the primary link between Cincinnati and Louisville.

Ohio

Much of I-71 in Ohio was intended to be SR 1. SR 1 was originally planned in the 1950s as a second Ohio Turnpike extending southwest to northeast across the state. It was planned to run from Cincinnati to Conneaut and connect with an extension built across the panhandle of Pennsylvania to the New York State Thruway. As the highway was being planned, the Federal Aid Highway Act of 1956 was enacted, and the project was converted from a toll road to a freeway. It was designated as SR 1, since the Interstate Highway numbering system had not yet been implemented. Portions of the freeway began to be completed and opened in 1959 with the new Interstate Highway funding, and they were marked as SR 1 as well as with their new Interstate Highway number. Since large gaps existed along the corridor where no freeway had yet been completed, existing two-lane or four-lane highways were also designated as SR 1 in order to complete the route. The SR 1 signage was removed in 1966 as the Interstate Highway numbers adequately marked the route by then and the state highway numbering was superfluous.

In Columbus, the portion of I-71 that bounds Worthington's eastern edge was originally called the North Freeway. Costing $13.8 million (equivalent to $ in ), it was constructed south from SR 161, arriving at 11th Avenue by August 1961. It took another year to construct the portion between 11th Avenue and 5th Avenue, mainly due to the need to construct a massive underpass under the Pennsylvania Railroad's Grogan Yard. Today, only two tracks cross the viaduct, and the rest of the structure supports a large, weedy field. By August 1962, the freeway had reached Fifth Avenue, and it reached downtown in November 1962.

I-71 was originally planned to follow the Innerbelt Freeway northward from its current northern terminus to the Cleveland Memorial Shoreway at Dead Man's Curve when I-90 was planned to continue westward from there along the Shoreway.

Upon its completion, I-71 replaced SR 3 as the primary highway link between Cincinnati, Columbus, and Cleveland.

Between 2004 and 2006, the interchange at milepost 121 in the far northern reaches of Columbus was reconstructed to allow access to the eastern extension of Gemini Place. Before that, it was a simple diamond interchange with SR 750 (Polaris Parkway).

Rebuilding and widening program
In 1999, the state of Ohio began a 10-year, $500-million (equivalent to $ in ) project to improve I-71 between Columbus and Cleveland. The plans did not include widening the  stretch in Delaware and Morrow counties, calling for patching that section instead. At that time, state transportation officials said they did not plan to widen that section for two reasons: Traffic studies didn't support the widening, and there was no money for the project. But Ohio Department of Transportation (ODOT) officials eventually gave in under pressure from elected officials and business owners to widen the remaining  stretch of I-71 from just north of the US 36/SR 37 interchange in Delaware County to the Morrow–Richland county line. The reconstruction and widening on the last  stretch of I-71 in Delaware and Morrow counties began in spring 2012, and the work was completed in mid-2015 at a cost of $144 million (equivalent to $ in ).

Exit list

Auxiliary routes
I-71 has two auxiliary routes in the Cleveland metropolitan area and in the Cincinnati metropolitan area. I-471 links downtown Cincinnati with I-275. I-271 provides access to Cleveland's eastern suburbs and enables travelers on I-71 to access I-90 east without going through Cleveland proper.

See also
Carrollton bus disaster, a drunk-driving tragedy involving a school bus that occurred on I-71
Roads in Louisville, Kentucky
Sports rivalries involving cities on I-71
Battle of Ohio: Cincinnati Bengals–Cleveland Browns
Crosstown Shootout: Cincinnati Bearcats–Xavier Musketeers (college basketball)
The Keg of Nails: Cincinnati Bearcats–Louisville Cardinals (college football)
Ohio Cup: Cincinnati Reds–Cleveland Guardians
Hell Is Real Derby: Columbus Crew SC–FC Cincinnati

References

External links

I-71 on Cincinnati-Transit.net
Interstate-guide.com: Interstate 71
Historic photos: 1963 aerial view of I-71 construction between 17th and 5th avenues in Columbus, Ohio Gasoline tanker crash and fire collapses Cleveland Avenue overpass in Columbus, Ohio 6/28/1966 Rebuilding the Cleveland Avenue overpass after it was destroyed by a gasoline tanker fire in 1966

Interstate 71
71
71
71
0071
Roads in Cincinnati
Transportation in Columbus, Ohio
Transportation in Cleveland
Transportation in Jefferson County, Kentucky
Transportation in Oldham County, Kentucky
Transportation in Henry County, Kentucky
Transportation in Trimble County, Kentucky
Transportation in Carroll County, Kentucky
Transportation in Gallatin County, Kentucky
Transportation in Boone County, Kentucky
Transportation in Kenton County, Kentucky
Transportation in Hamilton County, Ohio
Transportation in Warren County, Ohio
Transportation in Clinton County, Ohio
Transportation in Greene County, Ohio
Transportation in Fayette County, Ohio
Transportation in Madison County, Ohio
Transportation in Franklin County, Ohio
Transportation in Delaware County, Ohio
Transportation in Morrow County, Ohio
Transportation in Richland County, Ohio
Transportation in Ashland County, Ohio
Transportation in Wayne County, Ohio
Transportation in Medina County, Ohio
Transportation in Cuyahoga County, Ohio